James Waterman Glover (24 July 1868, Clio, Michigan – 15 July 1941, Ann Arbor, Michigan) was an American mathematician, statistician, and actuary.

Biography
He received in 1892, his bachelor's degree from the University of Michigan and in 1895 his Ph.D. in mathematics under Maxime Bôcher from Harvard University with thesis Properties of the Partial Differential Equation . He became in 1895 an instructor, in 1903 an assistant professor, in 1906 an associate professor, and in 1911 a full professor at the University of Michigan, retiring as professor emeritus in 1938.

His keen interest in the theory of probability led him in 1902 to introduce a course in actuarial theory—the first course ever offered in this subject by any University in this country. As a result of his pioneering in this new field, his services were demanded by various states, the United States government, and by Canada in connection with various insurance, pension and banking investigations. He has also served various insurance companies in the capacity of consulting actuary. From 1910 to 1929 he served the U. S. Census Bureau as Expert Special Agent and during this time the United States Life Tables were prepared under his supervision ... From 1930 to 1932, while on leave of absence ... Professor Glover served as President of the Teachers Insurance and Annuity Association of America.

From 1927 to 1934 he was the chair of the University of Michigan's department of mathematics. His graduate students include Cecil C. Craig.

In 1915 Glover was elected a Fellow of the Casualty Actuarial Society. In 1916 he was named a Fellow of the American Statistical Association. In 1924 he was an Invited Speaker of the ICM in Toronto.

Selected publications

Articles

Books

with Laurence Ilsley Hewes: 

with Harry C. Carver: 
with Earl C. Wightman:

References

1868 births
1941 deaths
People from Clio, Michigan
American actuaries
American statisticians
20th-century American mathematicians
University of Michigan alumni
Harvard Graduate School of Arts and Sciences alumni
University of Michigan faculty
Fellows of the American Statistical Association
19th-century American mathematicians